Spark is Thomas Leeb's second available release and features nine instrumentals and one song with vocals.

Track listing

 "Albino"
 "Oft Geht Bled"
 "Spark"
 "Jebuda"
 "Proseta Se Jovka Kumanovka"
 "Wuschel"
 "Cycles"
 "Jovanova Majka"
 "Atsia-Songs"
 "Lemming"
 "Sweet Child O' Mine"
 "Theme and Variations"
 "Pippi"

All songs by Thomas Leeb, except 
 "Proseta Se Jovka Kumanovka" (Traditional, arr. Leeb, Tadić)
 "Cycles" (Ana Friedman, arr. Leeb)
 "Jovanova Majka" (Traditional, arr. Leeb, Tadić)
 "Atsia Songs" (Traditional, arr. Leeb)
 "Sweet Child o'Mine" (Guns'N'Roses, arr. Leeb)
 "Theme and Variations" (Op. 76 No 3.) (Haydn, arr. Leeb)
 "Pippi" (Traditional, arr. Leeb)

Personnel

Thomas Leeb - acoustic guitar, vocals, sogo, bells
Miroslav Tadić - baritone guitar
Evan Fraser - kalimba
Josh Cohen - acoustic guitar
Anthony Douglass - bells, kidi
Giedrius Maculevicius - armpit

References

2004 albums
Thomas Leeb albums